Kyzyl-Bulyak (Qıźılbüläk) is a rural locality (a village) in Starotuymazinsky Selsoviet, Tuymazinsky District, Bashkortostan, Russia. The population was 76 as of 2010. There are 4 streets.

Geography 
Kyzyl-Bulyak is located 11 km southwest of Tuymazy (the district's administrative centre) by road. Gorny is the nearest rural locality.

References 

Rural localities in Tuymazinsky District